Novostroyka is a rural locality (a settlement) and the administrative center of Kalashnikovskoye Rural Settlement, Pallasovsky District, Volgograd Oblast, Russia. The population was 1,926 as of 2010. There are 37 streets.

Geography 
Novostroyka is located on the left bank of the Torgun River, 4 km south of Pallasovka (the district's administrative centre) by road. Pallasovka is the nearest rural locality.

References 

Rural localities in Pallasovsky District